The GF method, sometimes referred to as FG method, is a classical mechanical method introduced by Edgar Bright Wilson to obtain certain internal coordinates for a vibrating semi-rigid molecule, the so-called normal coordinates Qk. Normal coordinates decouple the classical vibrational motions of the molecule and thus give an easy route to obtaining vibrational amplitudes of the atoms as a function of time. In Wilson's GF method it is assumed that the molecular kinetic energy consists only of harmonic vibrations of the atoms, i.e.,  overall rotational and translational energy is ignored. Normal coordinates appear also in a quantum mechanical description of the  vibrational motions of the molecule and the Coriolis coupling between rotations and vibrations.

It follows from application of the Eckart conditions that the matrix G−1 gives the kinetic energy in terms of arbitrary linear internal coordinates, while F represents the (harmonic) potential energy in terms of these coordinates. The GF method gives the linear transformation from general internal coordinates to the special set of normal coordinates.

The GF method 
A non-linear molecule consisting of N atoms has 3N − 6  internal degrees of freedom, because positioning a molecule in three-dimensional space requires three degrees of freedom, and the description of its orientation in space requires another three degree of freedom. These degrees of freedom must be subtracted from the 3N degrees of freedom of a system of N particles.

The interaction among atoms in a molecule is described by a potential energy surface (PES), which is a function of 3N − 6 coordinates. The internal degrees of freedom s1, ...,  s3N−6 describing the PES in an optimal way are often non-linear; they are for instance valence coordinates, such as bending and torsion angles and bond stretches. It is possible to write the quantum mechanical kinetic energy operator for such curvilinear coordinates, but it is hard to formulate a general theory applicable to any molecule. This is why Wilson linearized the internal coordinates by assuming small displacements. The linearized version of  the internal coordinate st is denoted by St.

The PES V can be Taylor expanded around its minimum in terms of the St.  The third term (the Hessian of V) evaluated in the minimum is a force derivative matrix F. In the harmonic approximation the Taylor series is ended after this term. The second term, containing first derivatives, is zero because it is evaluated in the minimum of V. The first term can be included in the zero of energy.
Thus,

The classical vibrational kinetic energy has the form:

where gst is an element of the metric tensor of the internal (curvilinear) coordinates. The dots indicate time derivatives. Mixed terms  generally present in curvilinear coordinates are not present here, because only linear coordinate transformations are used. Evaluation of the metric tensor g in the minimum s0 of V gives the positive definite and symmetric matrix G = g(s0)−1.
One can solve the two matrix problems

simultaneously, since they are equivalent to the generalized eigenvalue problem

The matrix L−1 contains the normal coordinates  Qk in its rows:

Because of the form of the generalized eigenvalue problem, the method is called the GF method,
often with the name of its originator attached to it: Wilson's GF method. By matrix transposition in both sides of the equation and using the fact that both G and F are symmetric matrices, as are diagonal matrices, one can recast this equation into a very similar one  for FG . This is why the method is also referred to as Wilson's FG method.

We  introduce  the vectors

which satisfy the relation

Upon use of the results of the generalized eigenvalue equation, the energy E = T  + V (in the harmonic approximation) of the molecule becomes:

The Lagrangian L = T − V is

The corresponding Lagrange equations are identical to the Newton equations

for a set of uncoupled harmonic oscillators. These ordinary second-order differential equations are easily solved, yielding Qt as a function of time; see the article on  harmonic oscillators.

Normal coordinates in terms of Cartesian displacement coordinates 
Often the normal coordinates are expressed as linear combinations of Cartesian displacement coordinates.
Let RA be the position vector of nucleus A and RA0
the corresponding equilibrium position. Then
 is by definition the Cartesian displacement coordinate of nucleus A.
Wilson's  linearizing of the internal curvilinear coordinates qt expresses the coordinate St in terms  of the displacement coordinates

where sAt is known as a Wilson s-vector.

The actual form of the matrix elements  of B can be fairly complicated.
See for  more details on this method, known as
the Wilson s-vector method, the book by Wilson et al., or molecular vibration.  Now,

which can be inverted and put in summation language:

Here D is a (3N − 6) × 3N matrix, which is given by (i) the linearization of the internal coordinates s (an algebraic process)  and (ii) solution of  Wilson's GF equations (a numeric process).

Matrices involved in the analysis 
There are several related coordinate systems commonly used in the GF matrix analysis. These quantities are related by a variety of matrices. For clarity, we provide the coordinate systems and their interrelations here.

The relevant coordinates are:

  Cartesian coordinates for each atom
  Internal coordinates for each atom
  Mass-weighted Cartesian coordinates
  Normal coordinates

These different coordinate systems are related to one another by:

 , i.e. the matrix  transforms the Cartesian coordinates to (linearized) internal coordinates.
  i.e. the mass matrix  transforms Cartesian coordinates to mass-weighted Cartesian coordinates.
  i.e. the matrix  transforms the normal coordinates to mass-weighted internal coordinates.
  i.e. the matrix  transforms the normal coordinates to internal coordinates.

Note the useful relationship:

These matrices allow one to construct the G matrix quite simply as

Relation to Eckart conditions 

From the invariance of the internal coordinates St under overall rotation and translation
of the molecule, follows the same for the linearized coordinates stA.
It can be shown that this implies that the following 6 conditions are satisfied by the internal
coordinates,

These conditions follow from the  Eckart conditions that hold for the displacement vectors,

References

Further references 

Spectroscopy
Molecular physics
Quantum chemistry